The Rock and Roll Hall of Fame, established in 1983 and located in Cleveland, Ohio, United States, is dedicated to recording the history of some of the best-known and most influential musicians, bands, producers, and others that have in some major way influenced the music industry, particularly in the area of rock and roll. Originally, there were four categories of induction: performers, non-performers, early influences, and lifetime achievement. In 2000, "sidemen" was introduced as a category.

The only category that has seen new inductees every single year is the performers category. Artists become eligible for induction in that category 25 years after the release of their first record. In order to be inducted, an artist must be nominated by a committee that selects a number of candidates, the highest being 16 for the 2020 class. Ballots are then sent to more than 1,000 "rock experts" who evaluate the candidates and vote on who should be inducted. The performers that receive the highest number of votes are inducted. This number varies; for example, seven were inducted in 2019. Starting in 2012, fans could vote on a fan ballot with an equal weight to the other ballots. , new inductees are honored at an annual ceremony held alternately in New York and at the Hall of Fame in Cleveland; prior to that, the ceremonies rotated between Cleveland, New York, and Los Angeles. , there are 365 inductees.

Inductees

Performers 
The performers category is meant for recording artists and bands that have "influence and significance to the development and perpetuation of rock and roll".

Note 1. These backing bands were inducted by a separate committee, and not by the ballot voting used for all other performer inductees.

Note 2. This artist was later inducted into the Rock and Roll Hall of Fame after inducting someone else.

Note 3. This artist was already a member of the Rock and Roll Hall of Fame when they inducted someone else.

Note 4. Dire Straits were the first artist in the hall's history to not have an official induction speaker. Band member John Illsley did the induction speech himself.

Note 5. John Gustafson was originally included among the list of inducted members for Roxy Music; however, his name was dropped in the final list.

Note 6. In 2012, six additional bands and groups were inducted as performers by a special committee, due to the controversial nature of their band being excluded when their lead singer was inducted. "There was a lot of discussion about this," said Terry Stewart, a member of the nominating committee. "There had always been conversations about why the groups weren't included when the lead singers were inducted. Very honestly, nobody could really answer that question – it was so long ago... We decided we'd sit down as an organization and look at that. This is the result."

Note 7. Although Pat Benatar is a solo artist, her husband, guitarist and primary musical partner Neil Giraldo was also included as part of her induction.

Early influences 
Artists inducted into the early influences category were originally for (until 2021 with the inductions of Gil Scott-Heron and Kraftwerk) those "whose music predated rock and roll but had an impact on the evolution of rock and roll and inspired rock's leading artists". Unlike the performers category, these inductees are selected by a committee.

A. Previously nominated as a performer.

Non-performers (Ahmet Ertegun Award) 
The non-performer category honors "songwriters, producers, disc jockeys, record executives, journalists and other industry professionals who have had a major influence on the development of rock and roll". Several of the inductees in this category were in fact prominent performers as well. The inductees in this category are selected by the same committee that chooses the early influences. This category has been criticized for inducting those that have "been coming to the dinner for years and paying for their tickets" and for not revealing the Hall's full criteria. In 2008, this category was renamed the "Ahmet Ertegun Award".

Award for Musical Excellence 
Established in 2000 as "Sidemen", the category "honors those musicians, producers and others who have spent their careers out of the spotlight working with major artists on various parts of their recording and live careers". A separate committee, composed mainly of producers, chooses the inductees. In 2010, the category was renamed to the "Award for Musical Excellence". According to Joel Peresman, the president of the Rock and Roll Hall of Fame Foundation, "This award gives us flexibility to dive into some things and recognize some people who might not ordinarily get recognized."

A. Previously nominated in the performers category.
B. Inducted members: Garry Tallent, Roy Bittan, Max Weinberg, Steven Van Zandt, Nils Lofgren, Patti Scialfa, Clarence Clemons, Danny Federici, Vini Lopez, David Sancious.
C. Inducted members: Les Binks, K. K. Downing, Rob Halford, Ian Hill, Dave Holland, Glenn Tipton, Scott Travis.

Singles 
At the 2018 ceremony, a new induction category for singles was announced by Steven Van Zandt. According to Van Zandt, the category is "a recognition of the excellence of the singles that shaped rock 'n' roll, kind of a rock 'n' roll jukebox, records by artists not in the Rock Hall – which is not to say these artists will never be in the Rock Hall. They just are not in the Rock Hall at the moment." However, The Isley Brothers, whose song "Twist and Shout" was inducted in 2019, were inducted into the Rock and Roll Hall of Fame as performers in 1992.

Multiple inductees 
As of 2021, twenty-six performers have been inducted twice or more; fifteen have been recognized as a solo artist and with a band, and eight have been inducted with two separate bands. Eric Clapton is the only one to be inducted three times: as a solo artist, with Cream, and with The Yardbirds. Clyde McPhatter was the first to ever be inducted twice and is one of three artists to be inducted first as a solo artist and then as a member of a band, the other artists being Neil Young and Rod Stewart. Stephen Stills is the only artist to be inducted twice in the same year.

Crosby, Stills & Nash and The Beatles are the only two bands whose members were also each inducted separately, with other acts or as solo artists. In addition to their 1997 induction with CSN, David Crosby was inducted with The Byrds in 1991, Stephen Stills with Buffalo Springfield in 1997, and Graham Nash with The Hollies in 2010. Beatles members John Lennon, Paul McCartney, and George Harrison were inducted as solo artists in the main performer category, while Ringo Starr was inducted in the Award for Musical Excellence category.

There are several performers who were inducted with one (or more) of the bands they played for, but were not inducted as members of one (or more) other bands. For example, Neil Young was inducted with Buffalo Springfield and as a solo artist, but was left out when Crosby, Stills & Nash were inducted.

In 2019, Stevie Nicks became the first woman to be inducted twice, after having been inducted with Fleetwood Mac in 1998. She was later joined by Carole King and Tina Turner. In 2021, Carole King was the first person to be inducted as both a performer and a non-performer. 

John Lennon and Dave Grohl are the only two multiple inductees who were inducted in their first year of eligibility on both inductions.

Previously nominated artists 
The following artists have been nominated at least once for the Rock and Roll Hall of Fame, but have yet to be selected as an inductee.

D. Band member Nile Rodgers was inducted as an Award for Music Excellence recipient in 2017.
E. Band members Clyde McPhatter and Jackie Wilson were both inducted as solo artists in 1987, and McPhatter was inducted a second time as a member of the Drifters in 1988.
F. In addition to this nomination for his solo career, Ben E. King was inducted as a member of The Drifters in 1988.
G. In addition to these nominations for her solo career, Chaka Khan was also nominated four times as a member of Rufus.
H. In 2020, the band was nominated as "Rufus featuring Chaka Khan".
I. In addition to this nomination for his solo career, Sting was inducted as a member of The Police in 2003.
J. In addition to this nomination for his solo career, Steve Winwood was inducted as a member of Traffic in 2004.

2023 nominees
The nominees for the Rock and Roll Hall of Fame class of 2023 were announced on February 1, 2023.

 A Tribe Called Quest
 Kate Bush
 Sheryl Crow
 Missy Elliott
 Iron Maiden
 Joy Division/New Order
 Cyndi Lauper
 George Michael
 Willie Nelson
 Rage Against the Machine
 Soundgarden
 The Spinners
 The White Stripes
 Warren Zevon

Inductees also in the Country Music Hall of Fame 
As of 2022, there are 15 members of the Rock and Roll Hall of Fame also inducted into the Country Music Hall of Fame and Museum.

References

External links 

 

Lists of musicians
Rock and Roll
Music-related lists
Inductees